Close to a Miracle is the second solo album by Heather Small. It was released on 24 July 2006 and was preceded by the single for "Radio On" which featured remixes by Josh Harris.

Track listing

Charts

References

2006 albums
Heather Small albums